The Asadas is a Japanese family drama film released in 2020. It was directed by Ryōta Nakano. The film was part of the official selection for the Warsaw Film Festival and the 26th Busan International Film Festival.

Plot  
Masashi Asada is the gifted but irresponsible youngest son in a family, and a photographer.  His work initially revolves around taking staged photos of his family, depicting an ideal world where they do their dream jobs. Asada publishes his book, which has mediocre sales, and turns to his childhood crush for support. As his book starts to take off, he starts getting requests from average families for him to take photos of them.  When the 2011 Tōhoku earthquake happens, he volunteers to help cleaning and sorting out photographs from the family's victims. As part of this, he does some soul searching and realises the value of family.
The main character is based on the real-life photographer, Masashi Asada.

Production 
Filming took place in 2020, and it was distributed by Bridgehard in Europe and Toho Studios in the rest of the world.

Cast 
Kazunari Ninomiya as Masashi Asada
Satoshi Tsumabuki as Yukihiro Asada
Haru Kuroki as Wakana Kawakami
Masaki Suda as Yōsuke Ono
Jun Fubuki as Junko Asada
Mitsuru Hirata as Akira Asada
Makiko Watanabe
Yukiya Kitamura as Kenzō Shibukawa
Maho Nonami
Tarō Suruga
Nobue Iketani
Ryūto Iwata as young Masashi Asada
Tsubasa Nakagawa as young Yukihiro Asada

References

External links

2020 films
Japanese biographical films
Japanese drama films
2020s Japanese-language films
Films about the 2011 Tōhoku earthquake and tsunami
Films about families
Films about photography
Films set in Mie Prefecture
Toho films